Baron St John of Bletso, in the County of Bedford, is a title in the Peerage of England. It was created in 1582 for Oliver St John.

For a period, the title Baron St John was subsumed within the title Earl of Bolingbroke which was granted to the fourth Baron. The Earldom died out with the third Earl, but the Barony continued via another branch which had since become the baronet line. The eldest son of the 1st Earl was advanced to the barony by Writ of acceleration under King Charles I to become the 5th Baron. However he died in the civil war without becoming Earl, This resulted in the existence of an additional baron in the sequence but this was not taken into account by the family when the barony was continued.

Hence there is a discrepancy between the complete numbered series used by Burke and Debrett, and the numbering series in use by the family, particularly in the 18th and 19th century. Hence the numbers on family graves of this time are one less than the numbers used in the principal peerage registers that form the basis for this article.

History
According to Horace Round (1901) the St John family of Bletso are descended from the St Johns of Fonmon Castle in Glamorgan, Wales. Again according to Round, this was possibly a cadet branch of St John of Basing, Hampshire, and Halnaker, Sussex, which family descended in the male line from the Norman Hugh de Port (d.1091) lord of the manor of Port-en-Bessin in Normandy who took part in the Norman Conquest of England in 1066, and was subsequently granted 53 manors in Hampshire. However according to Brownhill (1931) the male ancestry of St John of Bletso cannot be traced further back than Alexander de St John (fl.1340) of Instow in Devon.

Oliver St John, the 1st Baron was the great-great-grandson of Sir John St John (died c. 1482), eldest son of Sir John Oliver St John of Bletso (died 1437), the husband of Margaret, great-great-granddaughter of Roger de Beauchamp (died 1380), who was summoned to Parliament as Baron Beauchamp of Bletso from 1363 to 1379. Since then that title had not been assumed although Oliver St John was considered to be the line of heir. He was succeeded by his son, the second Baron. He was one of the peers who sat during the trial of Mary, Queen of Scots. He died without male heirs and the claim to the barony of Beauchamp of Bletsoe passed to his daughter Anne, the wife of William Howard, Lord Howard Effingham, eldest son and heir of Charles Howard, 1st Earl of Nottingham.

He was succeeded in the barony of St John of Bletsoe by his younger brother, the third Baron. The latter's son, the fourth Baron, was created Earl of Bolingbroke in 1624. His eldest son and heir apparent, Oliver St John, was in 1641 summoned to the House of Lords through a writ of acceleration in his father's junior title of Baron St John of Bletsoe. However, he predeceased his father (killed at the Battle of Edgehill in 1642) but due to the writ of acceleration issued he is known as the fifth Baron St John of Bletsoe. The Earl was succeeded by his grandson, the second Earl. He was the son of Sir Paulet St John, younger son of the first Earl. He died childless and was succeeded by his younger brother, the third Earl, who represented Bedford in the House of Commons. He never married and on his death in 1711 the earldom became extinct.

The barony was inherited by his second cousin once removed, Sir Paulet St Andrew St John, 5th Baronet, who became the eighth Baron. He was the great-great-grandson of the Hon. Sir Rowland St John, fourth son of the third Baron (see below for more information on the baronetcy). His cousin's son, the fourteenth Baron, sat as a Member of Parliament for Bedfordshire. His grandson, the seventeenth Baron, served as Lord Lieutenant of Bedfordshire from 1905 to 1912.  the titles are held by the latter's great-grandson, the twenty-second Baron, who succeeded his father in 1978. He is one of the ninety elected hereditary peers that remain in the House of Lords after the passing of the House of Lords Act 1999, and sits as a cross-bencher.

The St John Baronetcy, of Northwood in the County of Northampton, was created in the Baronetage of England in 1660 for Oliver St John. He was the son of the Hon. Sir Rowland St John, fourth son of the third Baron St John of Bletsoe. His son, the second Baronet, represented Northamptonshire in the House of Commons. The latter's grandson, the fifth Baronet, succeeded as eighth Baron St John of Bletsoe in 1711 (see above for later history of the titles).

Oliver St John (died c. 1497), younger brother of the aforementioned Sir John St John (died c. 1482), was the ancestor of the Viscounts Grandison and the Viscounts Bolingbroke and St John.

Barons St John of Bletso (1559)

Oliver St John, 1st Baron St John of Bletso (died 1582)
John St John, 2nd Baron St John of Bletso (died 1596)
Oliver St John, 3rd Baron St John of Bletso (–1618)
Oliver St John, 4th Baron St John of Bletso (died 1646) (created Earl of Bolingbroke in 1624)

Earls of Bolingbroke (1624)
Oliver St John, 1st Earl of Bolingbroke, 4th Baron St John of Bletso (died 1646)
Oliver St John, 5th Baron St John of Bletso (died 1642) (writ of acceleration)
Oliver St John, 2nd Earl of Bolingbroke, 6th Baron St John of Bletso (died 1688)
Paulet St John, 3rd Earl of Bolingbroke, 7th Baron St John of Bletso (died 1711)

Barons St John of Bletso (1559; reverted)
Note: some sources do not count the 5th baron above as of this creation, as Debrett's and the Complete Peerage do. He was summoned to Parliament in his father's lifetime in the lesser title, but did not survive to inherit from him. In such sources the barons are numbered one less.

Paulet St Andrew St John, 8th Baron St John of Bletso (died 1714)
William St John, 9th Baron St John of Bletso (died 1720)
Rowland St John, 10th Baron St John of Bletso (died 1722)
John St John, 11th Baron St John of Bletso (died 1757)
John St John, 12th Baron St John of Bletso (1725–1767)
Henry Beauchamp St John, 13th Baron St John of Bletso (1758–1805)
St Andrew St John, 14th Baron St John of Bletso (1759–1817)
St Andrew Beauchamp St John, 15th Baron St John of Bletso (1811–1874)
St Andrew St John, 16th Baron St John of Bletso (1840–1887)
Beauchamp Mowbray St John, 17th Baron St John of Bletso (1844–1912)
Henry Beauchamp Oliver St John, 18th Baron St John of Bletso (1876–1920)
Moubray St Andrew Thornton St John, 19th Baron St John of Bletso (1877–1934)
John Mowbray Russell St John, 20th Baron St John of Bletso (1917–1976)
Andrew Beauchamp St John, 21st Baron St John of Bletso (1918–1978)
Anthony Tudor St John, 22nd Baron St John of Bletso (born 1957)

The heir apparent is the present holder's son Hon. Oliver Beauchamp St John (born 1995).

St John Baronets, of Woodford (1660)
Sir Oliver St John, 1st Baronet (c. 1624–1662) (son of Rowland St John, fourth son of 3rd Baron above)
Sir St Andrew St John, 2nd Baronet (1658–1709)
Sir Oliver St John, 3rd Baronet (c. 1683–c. 1710)
Sir St Andrew St John, 4th Baronet (c. 1685–1711; brother)
Sir Paulet St Andrew St John, 5th Baronet (1711–1714) (posthumous son; succeeded at birth as Baronet and as Baron St John of Bletso)
see above for further holders

See also
Baron Beauchamp of Bletsoe
Viscount Grandison
Viscount Bolingbroke and St John

Notes

References
 Cokayne, George Edward, Geoffrey H. White, ed. (1949). The Complete Peerage, or a history of the House of Lords and all its members from the earliest times Vol. 11 (2nd ed.). London: The St. Catherine Press.
Kidd, Charles, Williamson, David (editors). Debrett's Peerage and Baronetage (1990 edition). New York: St Martin's Press, 1990, 

Baronies in the Peerage of England
St John family
 
Noble titles created in 1559